The subfamily Dryadoideae consists of four genera in the family Rosaceae, all of which contain representative species with root nodules that host the nitrogen-fixing bacterium Frankia. They are subshrubs, shrubs, or small trees with a base chromosome number of 9, whose fruits are either an achene or an aggregate of achenes.

Taxonomic history
The subfamily has at various times been separated as its own family (Dryadaceae), or as a tribe (Dryadeae) or subtribe (Dryadinae).

References

External links 
 
 

 
Rosid subfamilies